Ulrica Schenström (born 1972) is a Swedish politician and a member of the Moderate Party. She was Secretary of state to the Prime Minister in the Cabinet of Fredrik Reinfeldt (2006–2007). She resigned from her position after she was photographed in a restaurant embracing and kissing a political journalist from TV4.

References

1972 births
Living people
Moderate Party politicians
21st-century Swedish women politicians